Nephrotoma guestfalica is a species of fly in the family Tipulidae. It is found in the  Palearctic.

References

Tipulidae
Insects described in 1879
Nematoceran flies of Europe